Lalapaşa is a town and district of Edirne Province in the Marmara region of Turkey. The mayor is İsmail Arslan (AKP). As of 2014, the town has a population of 1612, while the total population of the district is 7077.

History 
Lalapaşa was conquered by Lala Şahin Pasha in 1361. The town was named after him. Until the Balkan Wars, the town was known as Paşaköy (translated: Pashatown).

Geography 
The district is located 22 kilometers from Edirne and around 260 kilometers from Istanbul. The district borders Bulgaria to the north and west, the Edirne district to the south-west, Süloğlu to the south-east and the Kırklareli province to the north-east.

References

External links 
 District municipality's official website 

Populated places in Edirne Province
Districts of Edirne Province